The 1984 European Curling Championships were held from 9 to 14 December at the Palais des Sports arena in Morzine, France.

The Swiss men's team skipped by Peter Attinger Jr. won their fifth European title, and the German women's team skipped by Almut Hege won their first European title.

Men's

Teams

Round robin
Group A

Group B

  Teams to playoffs
  Teams to tiebreaker

Tiebreaker

Ranking games for 5th-14th places

Playoffs

Final standings

Women's

Teams

Round robin
Group A

Group B

  Teams to playoffs

Ranking games for 5th-14th places

Playoffs

Final standings

References

European Curling Championships, 1984
European Curling Championships, 1984
European Curling Championships
Curling competitions in France
International sports competitions hosted by France
European Curling Championships
1984 European Curling Championships